New Inn Hall Street is a street in central Oxford, England, and is one of Oxford's oldest streets. It is a shopping street running north–south parallel and to the west of Cornmarket Street, with George Street to the north and Bonn Square at the west end of Queen Street to the south. St Michael's Street leads off the street to the east near the northern end. Shoe Lane to the east leads to the Clarendon Centre, a modern shopping centre.

St Peter's College, University of Oxford (formerly St Peter's Hall), is on the west side of the street. The college occupies the site of two of the University's oldest Inns (medieval hostels), Bishop Trellick's, later New Inn Hall (after which the street is named), and Rose Hall, both founded in the 13th century. The college chapel was built in 1874 on New Inn Hall Street, originally as the parish Church of St Peter-le-Bailey. Two previous church buildings of the same name were previously at the southern end of the street, near Bonn Square, where the graveyard used to be. The church was so named because of its proximity to Oxford Castle.

Amongst the students of New Inn Hall was John Wesley, grandfather of the John and Charles Wesley regarded as the founders of Methodism. The first Methodist Meeting House in Oxford was in the street, on a site opposite its present-day successor Wesley Memorial Church.

Brasenose College's Frewin Hall annexe is on the west side of the street.

The City of Oxford High School for Boys occupied a site on the corner with George Street until 1966. The building now houses the University's Faculty of History.

Gallery

References

External links
 Information on all the shops, restaurants, colleges and other businesses on New Inn Hall Street on OxfordCityGuide.com
 Parish boundary of St Michael's Church, New Inn Hall Street, Oxford
 Mortons cafe information from Daily Information
 Morton's cafe information from the Oxford Guide
 Coffee Republic, on the corner with George Street, information from the Oxford Guide

Streets in Oxford
Shopping streets in Oxford
St Peter's College, Oxford